The Levantine Sea (Arabic: بحر المشرق, Hebrew: הים הלבנטיני) is the easternmost part of the Mediterranean Sea.

Geography 
The Levantine Sea is bordered by Turkey in the north and north-east corner, Syria, Lebanon, Israel, and Palestine in the east, Egypt in the south, and the Aegean Sea in the northwest. Where it is used as a term its western border is amorphous, hence Mediterranean is more commonly used. The open western border to the next part of the Mediterranean (the Libyan Sea) is defined as a line from headland Ras al-Helal in Libya to Gavdos, south of the western half of Crete. 

The largest island in its subset of water is Cyprus.

The northern part of the Levantine Sea between Cyprus and Turkey can be further specified as the Cilician Sea, a term more arcane. Also in the north are two large bays, the Gulf of İskenderun (to the northeast) and the Gulf of Antalya (to the northwest).

Basins

The Leviathan gas field is quite central in the south-eastern corner, the Levantine Basin.

Ecology

The Suez Canal was completed in 1869, linking the Levantine Sea to the Red Sea – and mainly for large vessels. The Red Sea sits a little higher than the Eastern Mediterranean, so the canal is an intermittent tidal strait discharging water into the Mediterranean. The Bitter Lakes – hypersaline natural lakes, interacting with the canal – were a bar to migration of Red Sea species northward for many decades, but as their salinity has virtually equalized with that of the Red Sea, the barrier to migration was removed, and plants and animals from the Red Sea have begun to colonize the eastern Mediterranean. This is the Lessepsian migration, after Ferdinand de Lesseps, the chief engineer of the canal.

Most of the river discharge is from the Nile. Since the Aswan High Dam sits across the river in the 1960s it has facilitated the multiplication of Egyptian agriculture and population. It has reduced, to the sea, the flow of freshwater, mountainous minerals in the silt, and the distance traveled by silt (before this, borne by floodwater). This makes the sea slightly saltier and nutrient-poorer than before. This has decimated the morning sardine litorine haul in nets but favored many Red Sea species.

See also
Eastern Mediterranean
Levant

References

Further reading
Kubin, Elisabeth; Poulain, Pierre-Marie; Mauri, Elena; Menna, Milena; Notarstefano, Giulio. 2019. "Levantine Intermediate and Levantine Deep Water Formation: An Argo Float Study from 2001 to 2017" Water 11, no. 9: 1781. https://doi.org/10.3390/w11091781 
Özsoy, E. and H. Güngör (1993). The Northern Levantine Sea Circulation Based on Combined Analysis of CTD and ADCP Data, In: P. Brasseur (editor), Data Assimilation: Tools for Modelling the Ocean in a Global Change Perspective, NATO ASI Series, Springer-Verlag, Berlin.
Sur, H. İ., Özsoy, E., and Ü. Ünlüata, (1992). Simultaneous Deep and Intermediate Depth Convection in the Northern Levantine Sea, Winter 1992, Ocean.

External links

 Study and Analysis of Water Masses Formation in the Levantine Sea
 Long Term Ecological Research

Marginal seas of the Mediterranean
Seas of Turkey
Bodies of water of Syria
Bodies of water of Lebanon
Bodies of water of Israel
Bodies of water of Egypt
Bodies of water of Libya
Bodies of water of the State of Palestine
Ecoregions of Cyprus
Ecoregions of Egypt
Ecoregions of Israel
Ecoregions of Lebanon
Ecoregions of Syria
Ecoregions of Turkey
Ecoregions of Greece
Seas of Africa
Seas of Asia
European seas